WRDQ (channel 27) is an independent television station in Orlando, Florida, United States. It is owned Cox Media Group alongside ABC affiliate WFTV (channel 9). Both stations share studios on East South Street in downtown Orlando, while WRDQ's transmitter is located near Christmas, Florida.

History
The station's original construction permit was issued as early as 1990. Channel 27 first signed on the air on April 23, 2000, under the ownership of Reece Associates Ltd., with WFTV (which has been owned by Cox since 1985) operating the station under a local marketing agreement (LMA); Reece was co-owned by former WFTV reporter/anchor Marsha Reece. Several months before WRDQ signed on, in August 1999, the Federal Communications Commission (FCC) began allowing duopolies involving commercially licensed television stations, allowing Cox to exercise an option to acquire the station outright on February 1, 2001.

On May 24, 2011, Cox decided to use WRDQ to carry coverage of the Casey Anthony trial in full from 9 a.m. to 4 p.m., with WFTV airing the last hour from 4 to 5 p.m., preempting the station's weekday programming schedule. High interest in the trial eventually led to coverage being increasingly shifted to WFTV (with WRDQ generally only airing "more procedural" and "more dry or technical" portions); on June 8, coverage was moved to WFTV entirely, after ABC granted Cox permission to move ABC Daytime programming to WRDQ for remainder of the trial's duration. It returned to WFTV upon the trial's conclusion. ABC Daytime was temporarily moved to WRDQ once more during WFTV's coverage of the George Zimmerman trial in 2013.

From 2016 until 2019, WRDQ aired Orlando City SC soccer matches until WRBW began airing the matches starting in 2019.

Newscasts

Shortly after the station signed on, WFTV began producing a nightly half-hour 10 p.m. newscast for WRDQ (this resulted in the discontinuance of a prime time newscast in that same timeslot that WFTV had produced for then-UPN affiliate WRBW [channel 65] under a news share agreement); this program competes with an in-house newscast that runs for an hour on Fox owned-and-operated station WOFL (channel 35) and a newscast produced by NBC affiliate WESH that it produces for CW-affiliated sister station WKCF (channel 18).

On June 29, 2006, WFTV began broadcasting newscasts in high definition; the WRDQ shows were included in the upgrade.

In January 2007, WFTV also began producing a two-hour weekday morning newscast from 7:00–9:00 a.m. on channel 27. Prior to the debut of the morning newscast, the 10:00 p.m. news program was branded as Action News at 10. This title was derived from WRDQ's general station branding ("Action TV 27") at the time of the station's launch ("Action" had ceased to be used as an overall station branding term several years before the newscast was renamed). WRDQ has also aired The Daily Buzz from 7:00–9:00 a.m. on digital subchannel 27.2, preempting some classic programming broadcast by Antenna TV that are seen on that slot nationally on that network's other affiliates. On two occasions, WRDQ has also aired early evening newscasts; a 7 p.m. newscast was produced for a time in March 2003 to present Iraq War coverage, and a 6:30 p.m. newscast was seen on the station from September 2010 until it was dropped in June 2013 in favor of a 4 p.m. newscast on WFTV. On September 15, 2014, WFTV expanded the weeknight 10:00 p.m. news on WRDQ to an hour, citing the ratings success of the broadcast in which has now able to tightly compete against long-time leader WOFL.

Technical information

Subchannels
The station's digital channel is multiplexed:

On April 14, 2008, the station launched a new digital sub-channel 27.2 to carry the Retro Television Network. On September 5, 2011, WRDQ replaced RTV with Antenna TV on its second digital subchannel. The RTV affiliation in Orlando then moved to a sub-channel of competitor WKMG-TV and later onto WRCF-CD. In June 2013, WRDQ added a third sub-channel 27.3. In January 2014, 27.3 was remapped as virtual channel 31.2 and used for a simulcast of Telemundo Orlando affiliate WTMO. On April 10, 2015, a fourth sub-channel 27.4 was added to accommodate the move of Grit TV from sister station WFTV. In 2020, WRDQ replaced Antenna TV with a duplicate station of Court TV on 27.2 which can be also seen on WOTF-DT5. On August 15, 2021 This TV replaced Grit TV.

Analog-to-digital conversion
WRDQ shut down its analog signal, on UHF channel 27, on June 12, 2009, as part of the federally mandated transition from analog to digital television. The station's digital signal relocated from its pre-transition UHF channel 14 to channel 27 for post-transition operations.

References

External links
TV27.com – Official WRDQ website
WFTV.com – Official WFTV website

Independent television stations in the United States
Court TV affiliates
This TV affiliates
Cox Media Group
Television channels and stations established in 2000
RDQ
2000 establishments in Florida
Major League Soccer over-the-air television broadcasters
Orlando City SC broadcasters